La Villeneuve is a commune in the Creuse department in the Nouvelle-Aquitaine region in central France.

Geography

Population

Sights
 The nineteenth-century church of St.Radegonde and a chapel.
 The Château du Rocher and its park.

See also
Communes of the Creuse department

References

Communes of Creuse